The Law Schools Global League or LSGL was instituted in 2012 by a selected number of globally leading law schools.

It has the primary aim of globally promoting and fostering scholastic research on law and legal education as well as encouraging collaboration among its members in the debate on issues impacting global law or legal practice.

Members

LSGL is composed of 34 research universities sharing a common vision and at the same time committed to education and research on global law and legal practice, namely:

 Católica Global School of Law
 China University of Political Science and Law
 EBS Universität für Wirtschaft und Recht
 FGV Direito Rio de Janeiro Law School
 FGV Direito São Paulo Law School
 Georgetown University
 Harry Radzyner Law School
 IE Law School
 Instituto Tecnológico Autónomo de México
 King’s College London
 Koç Üniversitesi Law School
 Kyushu University
 National Research University Higher School of Economics (*membership currently suspended)
 NUI Galway
 National University of Singapore
 Northwestern University Pritzker School of Law
 O.P. Jindal Global University
 Queen's University Belfast School of Law
 Seoul National University
 Stockholm University Faculty of Law
 Strathmore University
 The Chinese University of Hong Kong
 The Jagiellonian University
 Tilburg University
 UCLA School of Law
 Universidad de los Andes
 Università degli Studi di Torino
 Universität Freiburg
 University of Cape Town
 University of Edinburgh
 University of Queensland
 University of Pretoria
 UNSW Faculty of Law and Justice
 Wuhan University Law School

Objective

LSGL members share a commitment to foster the globalisation of law as well as the integration of global law into their research and teaching.

References

Law schools
International college and university associations and consortia